Phoolbagan is a neighbourhood in North Kolkata in Kolkata district in the Indian state of West Bengal. Subhas Sarovar is one of the famous tourist attraction of Kolkata present in the locality of Phoolbagan.

Geography

Police district
Phoolbagan police station is part of the Eastern Suburban division of Kolkata Police. It is located at P-86, CIT Road, Scheme VIIM, Kolkata-700 054.

Ultadanga Women police station covers all police districts under the jurisdiction of the Eastern Suburban division i.e.  Beliaghata, Entally, Maniktala, Narkeldanga, Ultadanga, Tangra and Phoolbagan.

Transport

Phoolbagan is the junction of CIT Road (Hem Chandra Naskar Road) and Narkeldanga Main Road (Maulana Abul Kalam Azad Sarani). EM Bypass passes along the eastern boundary of Phoolbagan. Many buses ply along these roads. ‘CIT Roads’ created by CIT through congested areas in the 1930s, developed such neighbourhoods as 
Beliaghata, Tiljala, Kankurgachi and Phoolbagan in eastern Kolkata.

Sealdah Station, Sir Gurudas Banerjee Halt railway station, Bidhannagar Road railway station and Phoolbagan metro station (Kolkata Metro Line 2) are located near Phoolbagan.

References

External links

Neighbourhoods in Kolkata